Dicymbium is a genus of  dwarf spiders that was first described by Anton Menge in 1868.

The etymology of the genus is based on the appearance of the male palp. The palpal tibia bears an elongated, broad, cup-shaped projection that surrounds the cymbium proper dorsally. Hence, Menge chose to name the genus Dicymbium, literally meaning two cymbia/a double cymbium.

Species
 it contains eight species and one subspecies:
Dicymbium elongatum (Emerton, 1882) – USA, Canada
Dicymbium facetum (L. Koch, 1879) – Russia (Urals to Far East), Mongolia
Dicymbium libidinosum (Kulczyński, 1926) – Russia (Middle Siberia to Far East), China
Dicymbium nigrum (Blackwall, 1834) (type) – Europe, Turkey, Caucasus, Russia (Europe to South Siberia), Kazakhstan, Kyrgyzstan, China
Dicymbium n. brevisetosum Locket, 1962 – Europe
Dicymbium salaputium Saito, 1986 – Japan
Dicymbium sinofacetum Tanasevitch, 2006 – China
Dicymbium tibiale (Blackwall, 1836) – Europe
Dicymbium yaginumai Eskov & Marusik, 1994 – Russia (Far East), Japan

See also
 List of Linyphiidae species

References

Araneomorphae genera
Linyphiidae
Spiders of Asia
Spiders of North America